Mount Lowell is a  mountain summit located in the Athabasca River valley of Jasper National Park, in the Canadian Rockies of Alberta, Canada. The name has not been officially adopted yet for this peak. It is situated at the head of Fryatt Creek Valley on the same high ridge as Mount Christie, Xerxes Peak, and Brussels Peak which is the nearest higher peak,  to the north. Mount Lowell can be seen from the Icefields Parkway.

History

The first ascent of the mountain was made in 1927 by Alfred Ostheimer with guides Hans Fuhrer and J. Weber. Alfred Ostheimer named the peak after A. Lawrence Lowell who was a mountaineer and the president of Harvard University when Ostheimer climbed it.

Geology

Mount Lowell is composed of sedimentary rock laid down from the Precambrian to Jurassic periods, then pushed east and over the top of younger rock during the Laramide orogeny.

Climate

Based on the Köppen climate classification, Mount Lowell is located in a subarctic climate with long, cold, snowy winters, and short mild summers. Temperatures can drop below -20°C with wind chill factors below -30°C. Precipitation runoff from Mount Lowell drains into Fryatt Creek and Lick Creek, both tributaries of the Athabasca River.

See also
List of mountains of Canada
Geology of Alberta
Geology of the Rocky Mountains

References

External links
 Parks Canada web site: Jasper National Park

Lowell
Lowell